A total solar eclipse took place on December 4, 2002, with a magnitude of 1.0244. A solar eclipse occurs when the Moon passes between Earth and the Sun, thereby totally or partly obscuring the image of the Sun for a viewer on Earth. A total solar eclipse occurs when the Moon's apparent diameter is larger than the Sun's, blocking all direct sunlight, turning day into darkness. Totality occurs in a narrow path across Earth's surface, with the partial solar eclipse visible over a surrounding region thousands of kilometres wide.
It was visible from a narrow corridor in southern Africa, the Indian Ocean and southern Australia. A partial eclipse was seen from the much broader path of the Moon's penumbra, including most of Africa and Australia. During the sunset after the eclipse many observers in Australia saw numerous and unusual forms of a green flash.

In some parts of Angola, it was the second total eclipse of the Sun within 18 months, following the Solar eclipse of June 21, 2001.

Images

Gallery

Related eclipses

Eclipse season 

This is the second eclipse this season.

First eclipse this season: 20 November 2002 Penumbral Lunar Eclipse

Eclipses of 2002 
 A penumbral lunar eclipse on May 26.
 An annular solar eclipse on June 10.
 A penumbral lunar eclipse on June 24.
 A penumbral lunar eclipse on November 20.
 A total solar eclipse on December 4.

Tzolkinex 
 Preceded: Solar eclipse of October 24, 1995

 Followed: Solar eclipse of January 15, 2010

Half-Saros 
 Preceded: Lunar eclipse of November 29, 1993

 Followed: Lunar eclipse of December 10, 2011

Tritos 
 Preceded: Solar eclipse of January 4, 1992

 Followed: Solar eclipse of November 3, 2013

Solar Saros 142 
 Preceded: Solar eclipse of November 22, 1984

 Followed: Solar eclipse of December 14, 2020

Inex 
 Preceded: Solar eclipse of December 24, 1973

 Followed: Solar eclipse of November 14, 2031

Solar eclipses 2000–2003

Saros 142

Tritos series

Metonic series

Notes

References
 Fred Espenak and Jay Anderson. "Total Solar Eclipse of 2002 December 4". NASA, November 2004.

 Google Map

Photos:
 Spaceweather.com: Dec. 4, 2002, Solar Eclipse Gallery and 
 Prof. Druckmüller's eclipse photography site. Australia
 Prof. Druckmüller's eclipse photography site. South Africa and Mozambique
 KryssTal - Eclipse from Botswana.
 Images from Australia by Crayford Manor House Astronomical Society 
 Total Solar Eclipse of 4 December 2002 seen in EUMETSAT satellite imagery.
 Zimbabwe Solar Eclipse, APOD 12/6/2002, Corona from Zimbabwe-South Africa border
 The Crown of the Sun, APOD 12/13/2002, Corona of total eclipse from Musina, South Africa
 Shadow Cone of a Total Solar Eclipse, APOD 1/6/2003, totality from South Australia

2002 12 04
2002 in science
2002 12 04
December 2002 events
2002 in Angola
2002 in Zambia
2002 in Zimbabwe
2002 in Botswana
2002 in Mozambique
2002 in South Africa
2002 in Australia